Berlin-Johannisthal (formerly Berlin-Betriebsbahnhof Schöneweide) is a railway station in the Treptow-Köpenick district of Berlin.

History

In the course of the development work of the so-called track lens next to the station, the station was renamed Johannisthal in 2020.

References

Schoneweide
Buildings and structures in Treptow-Köpenick
Railway stations in Germany opened in 1945